Howard Thomas Jasper (5 September 1919 – 9 February 1997) was an Australian rules footballer who played with South Melbourne in the Victorian Football League (VFL).

Notes

External links 

1919 births
1997 deaths
Australian rules footballers from Victoria (Australia)
Sydney Swans players